HD 88206 is a star in the southern constellation of Vela. It has the Bayer designation Q Velorum and the Gould designation 186G Velorum; HD 88206 is the identifier from the Henry Draper catalogue. The star has a blue-white hue and is faintly visible to the naked eye with an apparent visual magnitude of 4.85.

Parallax measurements provide a distance estimate of approximately 1,220 light years from the Sun. It is drifting further away with a radial velocity of +14 km/s. Although a young star and positioned in the general vicinity of the Scorpius–Centaurus association, it is most likely not a member.

This massive star has a stellar classification of B3III/IV, which suggests it is entering the giant stage of its evolution. It is 24 million years old with 9 times the mass of the Sun and about 4.5 times the Sun's radius. The star is radiating 9,580 times the luminosity of the Sun from its photosphere at an effective temperature of about 17,900 K.

References

B-type subgiants
Vela (constellation)
Velorum, Q
Durchmusterung objects
088206
049712
3990